Delhi Fire Service (DFS) is the state-owned service that attends fire/rescue calls in the National Capital Territory of Delhi in India. The service consists of 61 fire stations and 3616 personnel (3280 firefighters, 289 mechanics), and attends to  22,000 fire and rescue calls on an average every year. The administrative control of The Delhi Fire Service rests with the Government of National Capital Territory of Delhi. The average number of fire/rescue calls attended by DFS is much more than any other metropolitan fire services in India.

Zones

Delhi is divided into 3 zones with 2 geographical divisions within each:

 New Delhi Fire Zone - East Division and Central Divisions
 South Fire Zone  - South Division and South West Divisions
 West Fire Zone - West Division and North West Divisions

Command

 Director of Fire Services - 1
 Chief Fire Officer - 5
 Deputy Chief Fire Officers - 5
 Divisional Officers - 9
 Assistant Divisional Officers - 24

The department reports to Principal Secretary (Home)for the Government of NCT of Delhi.

Ranks
 Director
 Chief Fire Officer
 Dy. Chief Fire Officer
 Divisional Officer
 Assistant Divisional officer
 Station Officer 
 Sub-Officer & Sub Officers (Drivers)
 Leading Firemen
 Fireman & Fire operators

Notes and references

External links
Delhi Fire Service
A study, now archived here

State agencies of Delhi
Fire departments of India
1942 establishments in India